The Alameda Times-Star was a newspaper in the city of Alameda, California. It was last owned by Bay Area News Group-East Bay (BANG-EB), a subsidiary of MediaNews Group, who bought the paper in 1986.

The newspaper was scheduled to close down, with the last issue of the paper published on November 1, 2011, along with a proposal to end publication of The Oakland Tribune, Hayward Daily Review, Fremont Argus and West County Times. On November 2, subscribers were to get copies of the new East Bay Tribune, a localized edition of the Mercury News. The plan was modified to no longer have the East Bay Tribune, but to merge the publication of the Times-Star with the Oakland Tribune.

History
The Alameda Times-Star began as the Alameda Argus in 1877.

References

External links

Mass media in Alameda County, California
Alameda, California
Newspapers published in the San Francisco Bay Area
Defunct newspapers published in California
MediaNews Group publications
2011 disestablishments in California